Monty Python's The Meaning of Life is the tie-in companion book to the final film by Monty Python. It contains the screenplay, illustrated by many colour stills from the film.

The book contains sections of the film which were cut before the premiere, including "The Adventures of Martin Luther", which was later reinstated for the film's 20th anniversary "Director's Cut" DVD release in 2003. The Crimson Permanent Assurance is placed where it was to originally appear in the film, before it was excised and presented as the supporting feature.

The book concludes with a correspondence of letters between John Cleese and The Sun newspaper, regarding an alleged incident during the film's shooting.

Contents
 A Foreword by The Publishers
 Fish intro
 The Meaning of Life (titles)
 Part I – The Miracle of Birth
 The Miracle of Birth Part 2 – The Third World
 The Adventures of Martin Luther
 Part II – Growth and Learning
 Part III – Fighting Each Other
 The Middle of the Film – Find the Fish
 Part IV – Middle Age
 Part V – Live Organ Transplants
 The Crimson Permanent Assurance
 Part VI – The Autumn Years
 Part VI B – The Meaning of Life
 Part VII – Death
 Cast List
 John Cleese vs. The Sun

Credits
 Authors – Graham Chapman, John Cleese, Terry Gilliam, Eric Idle, Terry Jones, Michael Palin
 Designer – James Campus
 Animation Pages Designer – Kate Hepburn
 Stills Photography – David Appleby
 Additional Stills Photography – Clive Coote, Strat Mastoris
 Studio Assistance – Bridget Tisdall

References

Monty Python literature
Methuen Publishing books
1983 books
Books about meaning of life